Susan Bergman (née Heche; May 5, 1957January 1, 2006) was an American writer and literary scholar.

Biography and works
Bergman wrote her memoir Anonymity in 1994, which recounts the discovery, in 1983, of the closeted homosexuality and double life of her father, Don Heche, a devout Christian, choir director, and seemingly model family man, while he was dying of HIV/AIDS. Anonymity had its beginnings as Bergman's doctoral dissertation at Northwestern University.

Bergman was the sister of actress Anne Heche, who also wrote a memoir about their father and family background, in 2001. Heche's account differed in her accusations of sexual abuse against Don Heche, as well as detailing her tensions with the rest of the Heche family, leading to a rift, including with Susan.

In 1996, Bergman was editor of an anthology titled Martyrs: Contemporary Writers on Modern Lives of Faith, in which contemporary authors reflected on the lives of 20th Century religious and political martyrs. Bergman contributed the introductory chapter, a reflection on the nature of martyrdom and what it teaches about faith.

Like most of her family, Bergman was a life-long evangelical Christian, and religious themes are a frequent subject of her writing. In 1996, Christianity Today named her in their profile of "Up and Comers: Fifty evangelical leaders 40 and under". However, she stated that she did not consider herself part of the Christian right. Quoting the words of a friend of hers, Bergman stated: "I dare to believe that when Jesus invites all who labor and are heavy-laden, he's not screening for HIV, or voting behavior, or asking whether or not someone has had a divorce, or an abortion."

Bergman died on January 1, 2006, in Barrington, Illinois at the age of 48, after a three-year battle against a brain tumor.

Bibliography

Books

 (unpublished)

Anthologies
 (editor)

References

External links

 
 

1957 births
2006 deaths
20th-century American memoirists
20th-century American women writers
20th-century evangelicals
21st-century evangelicals
American women memoirists
Deaths from brain cancer in the United States
Evangelical writers
Northwestern University alumni
People from Bloomington, Indiana
Wheaton College (Illinois) alumni

fr:Susan Bergman
lb:Susan Bergman